Miss Venezuela 1992 was the 39th Miss Venezuela pageant, was held in Caracas, Venezuela on September 9, 1992, after weeks of events. The winner of the pageant was Milka Chulina, Miss Aragua.

The pageant was broadcast live on Venevision from the Poliedro de Caracas in Caracas, Venezuela. At the conclusion of the final night of competition, outgoing titleholder Carolina Izsak, crowned Milka Chulina of Aragua as the new Miss Venezuela.

Results
Miss Venezuela 1992 - Milka Chulina (Miss Aragua)
Miss World Venezuela 1992 - Francis Gago (Miss Bolívar) 
Miss Venezuela International 1992 - Maria Eugenia Rodriguez (Miss Portuguesa)

The runners-up were:
1st runner-up - Nelitza León (Miss Zulia)
2nd runner-up - Natalia Streignard (Miss Miranda)
3rd runner-up - Vanessa Mittermayer (Miss Barinas)
4th runner-up - Laura Gaerste (Miss Carabobo)
5th runner-up - Michelle Badillo (Miss Mérida)

Special awards
 Miss Photogenic (voted by press reporters) - Milka Chulina (Miss Aragua)
 Miss Congeniality - Delia Hernández (Miss Amazonas)
 Miss Elegance - Pilar Martínez (Miss Delta Amacuro)
 Most Beautiful Eyes - Nelitza León (Miss Zulia)
 Best Smile - Francis Gago (Miss Bolívar)

Delegates
The Miss Venezuela 1992 delegates are:

 Miss Amazonas - Delia Esperanza Hernández Bolívar
 Miss Anzoátegui - Dayana Coromoto Maltese González
 Miss Apure - Michelle Rivers Peñaloza
 Miss Aragua - Milka Yelisava Chulina Urbanich
 Miss Barinas - Vanessa Beatríz Mittermayer Varguillas
 Miss Bolívar - Francis del Valle Gago Aponte
 Miss Canaima - Tibisay Carolina Navarro Colmenares
 Miss Carabobo - Laura María Gaerste Chaparro
 Miss Cojedes - Mariana López Attanasi
 Miss Costa Oriental - Marián Cassandra Urdaneta Villalobos
 Miss Delta Amacuro - Pilar Martínez Caicedo
 Miss Dependencias Federales - Grisel Massó Cásares
 Miss Distrito Federal - María Cristina Alvarez Gutiérrez
 Miss Falcón - María Alexandra Gámez García
 Miss Guárico - Gabriela Elena Spanic Utrera
 Miss Lara - María Fernanda Briceño
 Miss Mérida - Michelle Coromoto Badillo Páez
 Miss Miranda  - Natalia Martínez Streignard-Negri
 Miss Monagas - Pierangela Marinucci Feliciani
 Miss Municipio Libertador - Maria Daniela Medina
 Miss Municipio Vargas - Jezebel Shirley Rabbe Ramírez
 Miss Nueva Esparta - Zulime Yelitza Regnault González
 Miss Península Goajira - Maria Luisa Fernández Parra
 Miss Península de Paraguaná - Liliana Karina Cedeño Rosas
 Miss Portuguesa - Maria Eugenia Rodríguez Noguera
 Miss Sucre - Hevis Scarlet Ortiz Pacheco
 Miss Táchira - Andrea Codriansky Strange
 Miss Trujillo - Luz Marina Belandria 
 Miss Yaracuy - Adriana González Pérez
 Miss Zulia - Nelitza Rosa León Ramos

External links
Miss Venezuela official website

1992 in Venezuela
1992 beauty pageants